The Thal Brigade was an Infantry formation of the Indian Army during World War II. It was formed in November 1938, for service on the North West Frontier. It was normal practice for newly formed battalions to be posted to the North West Frontier for service before being sent to Africa, Burma or Italy.

Formation
These units served in the brigade during World War II
1/13th Frontier Force Rifles
2/15th Punjab Regiment
1/17th Dogra Regiment
1/5th Mahratta Light Infantry
4th Jammu and Kashmir Infantry
1/7th Gurkha Rifles
Shamsher Dal Regiment, Nepal
2/6th Rajputana Rifles
6/10th Baluch Regiment
1/7th Gurkha Rifles
2nd Worcestershire Regiment
6/17th Dogra Regiment
2nd Patiala Infantry
7th Jammu and Kashmir Infantry
7/13th Frontier Force Rifles
8/9th Jat Regiment
9th Jammu and Kashmir Infantry
Bairab Nath Regiment, Nepal
Purnao Gorakh Regiment, Nepal
7/3rd Madras Regiment
14/7th Rajput Regiment
3/3rd Madras Regiment

See also

 List of Indian Army Brigades in World War II

References

British Indian Army brigades